Coelostathma placidana is a species of moth of the family Tortricidae. It is found in the south-eastern United States, from Virginia south to Florida and to eastern Texas.

References

External links

Moths described in 2012
Endemic fauna of the United States
Sparganothini